Ravenscraig  is a new town being built in North Lanarkshire, Scotland

Ravenscraig  may also refer to:

 Ravenscraig steelworks, the former steelworks on the site of the new town.
 Ravenscraig Regional Sports Facility, a newly built large sports complex on the site of the new town.
 Ravenscraig Castle, a ruined 15th century castle in Kirkcaldy.
 Ravenscraig Stadium, a multi-purpose stadium in Greenock.
 SS Ravenscraig
 Raven's Craig, a hill near Bathgate

See also
 Ravenscrag (disambiguation)